Julius Wechter (May 10, 1935 – February 1, 1999) was an American musician and composer who played the marimba and vibraphone. He also played various percussion instruments. He composed the song "Spanish Flea" for Herb Alpert and was leader of The Baja Marimba Band.

Biography
Born in Chicago, Wechter played vibraphone (vibes) and percussion for the Martin Denny group in the 1950s. In the early 1960s, he moved on to movie soundtracks and television, as well as session work for the likes of the Beach Boys, the Monkees, Sonny & Cher, and various Phil Spector productions. His Beach Boys contributions include the climactic timpani during the choruses of "Do You Wanna Dance?" and prominent vibraphone on "Let's Go Away for Awhile."

He began his long and successful association with Herb Alpert and his Tijuana Brass when he played percussion on the Tijuana Brass's first hit, "The Lonely Bull", in 1962. He later composed "Spanish Flea". Playing marimba and vibes on many of the songs on Alpert's subsequent albums in the 1960s, as well as writing at least one song on most of those albums, Wechter contributed much to the Tijuana Brass sound and style without receiving public credit for it at the time.

Encouraged by Alpert, Wechter formed the Baja Marimba Band  and was quite successful. The "BMB" placed four chart songs in Billboard's Top 100, and many more on its Easy Listening Top 40. When the band disbanded in the mid 1970s, Wechter turned his attention to TV and movies again, scoring the Disney film Midnight Madness.  He continued to play with Herb Alpert, joining his touring version of the Tijuana Brass in the mid 1970s.

In his later years, he devoted himself to psychology, earned a master's degree, and served as vice president of the Southern California chapter of the Tourette Syndrome Association.

Wechter died at his home in California of lung cancer, at the age of 63, a day after his song "Spanish Flea" was used in the Simpsons episode "Sunday, Cruddy Sunday".

Selected compositions
1964: Up Cherry Street
1965: Spanish Flea
1966: Brasilia
1966: Bean Bag (with Herb Alpert)
1966: Blue Sunday
1967: Shades Of Blue
1967: Flea Bag
1968: Panama
1968: Flyin' High
1970: Robbers and Cops

References

1935 births
1999 deaths
American percussionists
Musicians from Chicago
The T-Bones members
The Wrecking Crew (music) members
Marimbists
American vibraphonists
20th-century American musicians
American session musicians
Deaths from lung cancer in California
Musicians from Los Angeles
20th-century American male musicians